George Allen (20 April 1928 – 20 October 1995) was an Australian rules footballer who played for the South Melbourne Football Club in the Victorian Football League (VFL).

References

External links 

1928 births
1995 deaths
Australian rules footballers from Victoria (Australia)
Sydney Swans players
Port Melbourne Football Club players